Adam K. Goodheart is an American historian, essayist and author. He is known for his book on the social history of the early days of the American Civil War: 1861: The Civil War Awakening, and for his essays in publications such as The Atlantic, The New York Times, and National Geographic. He was one of the founders and senior editors of the magazine of the Library of Congress, Civilization.

Goodheart is the director of the C.V. Starr Center for the Study of the American Experience at Washington College.

Goodheart has a bachelor's degree from Harvard University.

References

External links

Living people
American male non-fiction writers
People from Philadelphia
American military writers
20th-century American historians
21st-century American historians
Historians of the American Civil War
Harvard University alumni
Historians from Pennsylvania
Washington College faculty
Year of birth missing (living people)